OnePlus Technology (Shenzhen) Co., Ltd., doing business as OnePlus, is a Chinese consumer electronics manufacturer headquartered in Shenzhen, Guangdong. It is a subsidiary of Oppo.

OnePlus was founded by Pete Lau and Carl Pei on 16 December 2013 to develop a high-end flagship smartphone running CyanogenMod that would come to be known as the OnePlus One. OnePlus would continue to release phones throughout the 2010s and 2020s. In 2020, OnePlus released the OnePlus Nord, its first mid-range smartphone since the OnePlus X in 2015. Pei would oversee the design and marketing of OnePlus' products until his departure from the company in October 2020, going on to found the consumer electronics manufacturer Nothing.  In 2022–2023, OnePlus is still actively producing affordably priced phones ($200–749 USD) with top-of-the-line specs comparable to leading Samsung phones, including 5G connectivity.  OnePlus is also partnered with T-Mobile to provide OnePlus Phone through T-Mobile to extend its legitimacy and reach.

History

2013–2014: Founding and OnePlus One
OnePlus Technology (Shenzhen) Co., Ltd. was founded on 16 December 2013 by former Oppo vice-president Pete Lau and Carl Pei. According to Chinese public records, OnePlus' only institutional shareholder is Oppo Electronics. Lau denied that OnePlus was a wholly owned subsidiary of Oppo and stated that Oppo Electronics and not Oppo Mobile (the phone manufacturer) is a major investor of OnePlus. Lau went on to state that they were "in talks with other investors", although OnePlus has confirmed it uses Oppo's manufacturing line and shares part of the supply chain resources with Oppo.

Lau founded OnePlus with the intent to design a smartphone that would balance high-end quality with a lower price than other phones in its class, believing that users would "never settle" (a slogan that would come to be used by OnePlus in its marketing material) for the lower-quality devices produced by other companies. Lau also showed aspirations of being the "Muji of the tech industry", emphasizing its focus on high-quality products with simplistic, user-friendly designs. Continuing Lau's association with the platform from the Oppo N1, OnePlus entered into an exclusive licensing agreement with Cyanogen Inc. to base its products' Android distribution upon a variant of the popular custom ROM CyanogenMod and use its trademarks outside of China. OnePlus would later develop a version of CyanogenMod, known as Cyanogen OS, for use in its phones.

The OnePlus One was introduced on 23 April 2014 as OnePlus' first smartphone. It differed from its competitors—largely flagship devices from larger phone manufacturers, in its usage of CyanogenOS, its openness to developers, and price-to-performance ratio in comparison to its hardware, although criticism was levied for technical issues. In order to reduce marketing costs, OnePlus relied instead on word of mouth and initially only allowed purchases via an invite system. Throughout early 2014, OnePlus would continue to expand, hiring Chinese celebrity author Han Han to help market its products in mainland China and expanding its operations to the European Union in March of that year. In December 2014, alongside the release of the OnePlus One in India exclusively through Amazon, OnePlus also announced plans to establish a presence in the country, with plans to open 25 official walk-in service centers across India.

2015–2019: Continued success, expansions in Southeast Asia
In 2015, OnePlus began an effort to expand in Southeast Asia, making its products available in the region for the first time, partnering with Lazada Indonesia in January 2015. In June 2016, OnePlus decided to pull out of the Indonesian market due to local regulations for imported 4G smartphones restricting sales of the OnePlus 2.

Also in 2015, OnePlus unveiled the OnePlus X, the company's first foray into the budget device market.

In May 2018, OnePlus would release the OnePlus Bullets Wireless earphones. In September of that year, OnePlus announced that it would be producing a line of smart TVs with OnePlus TV exclusively sold in India. The initial model of the OnePlus TV line, the OnePlus TV Q1, was released in September 2019.

2020–present: Further product launches, Carl Pei's resignation
OnePlus would release a series of new products in 2020, including the OnePlus Buds and the OnePlus Nord in July, the latter being OnePlus' first budget device since the release of the OnePlus X in 2015.

On 16 October 2020, Carl Pei resigned as the marketing director of OnePlus.

In 2021, Oppo and OnePlus would begin to build a partnership, combining their hardware research teams in January of that year. In July 2021, OnePlus merged OxygenOS, its Android-based operating system used since the OnePlus X and Oppo's ColorOS. The software of both companies continue to remain separate and serve their individual regions with OxygenOS for OnePlus phones globally and ColorOS on OnePlus and Oppo devices in China but share a common codebase, which OnePlus says should standardize its software experience and streamline the development process for future OxygenOS updates.

Products

Smartphones 
OnePlus releases two lines of smartphones: its flagship "OnePlus" line, and its budget-oriented Nord line. Both lines are equipped with an Android-based operating system known as OxygenOS.

OnePlus has also released phones outside of these lines, namely the OnePlus Ace and the OnePlus 10R.

As of 2022, 16 models in the OnePlus line have been produced and 5 models in the Nord line have been released. Models currently in production include:
 OnePlus 10T
 OnePlus 10 Pro
 OnePlus 9 Pro
 OnePlus 9
 OnePlus 8T
 OnePlus Nord N200 5G

Wearables 
OnePlus has released various wearables, including the OnePlus Bullets Wireless, OnePlus Buds, OnePlus Band, and the OnePlus Watch.

TVs

Through its OnePlus TV line of TVs exclusively sold in India, OnePlus maintains a line of TVs.

Advertising and marketing

Invitation system 
Early phones were only available through a system whereby customers had to sign up for an invitation, which OnePlus called an invite, to purchase the phone at irregular intervals. The system was claimed to be necessary for the young company to manage huge demand.
OnePlus ended the invitation system with the launch of OnePlus 3 on 14 June 2016. Announced via an interactive VR launch event, the OnePlus 3 initially went on sale within the VR app itself. OnePlus touted the event as the world's first VR shopping experience. The phone was made available for sale later that day in China, North America and the European Union on the OnePlus website, and in India on Amazon India.

"Smash the Past" 
On 23 April 2014, OnePlus began its "Smash the Past" campaign. The promotion asked selected participants to destroy their phones on video to purchase the OnePlus One for $1 (US). Due to confusion, several videos were published by unselected users misinterpreting the promotion and destroying their phones before the promotion start date. OnePlus later revised the rules of its promotion by allowing consumers to donate their old phones. There were 140,000 entrants in the contest with 100 winners.

OnePlus Playback 
OnePlus Playback is a series of music videos in collaboration with popular Indian singers, beginning in 2018.

Brand ambassador 
In May 2019, OnePlus made a deal with Avengers actor Robert Downey Jr. to endorse OnePlus 7 Pro. Previously, Indian actor Amitabh Bachchan endorsed OnePlus in India.

Partnership with Hasselblad 

On 8 March 2021, OnePlus announced a $150 million deal with Hasselblad to develop camera technology for OnePlus, which also included the new OnePlus 9 series phones that had improved color processing and computational photography developed in partnership with Hasselblad.

Criticism and controversies

"Ladies First" controversy 
For the launch of the OnePlus One in 2014, OnePlus hosted a contest to give invites—which were hard to come by at the time—to their female forum members. Users were asked to post a photo of themselves with the OnePlus logo; images would be shared in the forum and could be "liked" by other forum members. This received major backlash for objectifying and degrading women, resulting in the contest being pulled within hours.

Micromax antitrust lawsuit 
On 16 December 2014, the Supreme Court of India and the Delhi High Court banned the import and sale of OnePlus One phones following a lawsuit by Micromax alleging it has exclusivity for shipping phones with Cyanogen OS software in India.
On 21 December 2014, the ban was lifted, and the device continued to be shipped with Cyanogen OS. The following year a customized version of Android, specially designed by OnePlus and named OxygenOS was released, allowing later OnePlus devices to be sold in India.

OnePlus USB-C cable incident 
Throughout 2015, OnePlus received criticism for its manufacturing of its USB-C cables. After several weeks of customer complaints on OnePlus forums and on Reddit, Google engineer Benson Leung showed that the USB-C cable and USB-C to Micro-USB adapter offered by OnePlus at that time did not conform to the USB specification. OnePlus co-founder Carl Pei later admitted that the cable and adapter did not conform to the USB specification, and offered refunds (although not for cables bundled with the OnePlus 2 phone).

Customer support 
OnePlus' customer support has been the subject of criticism. In 2017, the company increased the number of customer service staff and set up customer service and repair centers in Asia, Europe, and the United States, greatly improving turnaround times for repairs and other issues.

App performance throttling 
In July 2021, the company was accused of and then admitted to throttling app performance. The throttling was uncovered by an investigation done by AnandTech, discovering that the OnePlus 9 significantly diminished the performance of Chrome in an effort to "improve battery life".

See also 
 Comparison of OnePlus smartphones
 Comparison of OnePlus TVs
 List of mobile phone makers by country

References

External links
 
 

 
Mobile phone manufacturers
Electronics companies of China
Privately held companies of China
Mobile phone companies of China
Chinese brands
Chinese companies established in 2013
BBK Electronics
Electronics companies established in 2013